The 2017 Federation Tournament of Champions took place at the Glens Falls Civic Center in Glens Falls on March 24, 25 and 26. Federation championships were awarded in the AA, A and B classifications. Abraham Lincoln in Brooklyn won the Class AA championship. Donald Cannon-Flores of Abraham Lincoln was named the Class AA tournament's Most Valuable Player.

Class AA 

Participating teams, results and individual honors in Class AA were as follows:

Participating teams

Results 

Abraham Lincoln finished the season with a 31-3 record. It was Abraham Lincoln's fifth state title, the most of any PSAL team.

Individual honors 

The following players were awarded individual honors for their performances at the Federation Tournament:

Most Valuable Player 

 Donald Cannon-Flores, Abraham Lincoln

All-Tournament Team 

 Greg Calixte, Mount Vernon
 Chris Coalmon, Long Island Lutheran
 Donatas Kupšas, Long Island Lutheran
 Michael Reid, Abraham Lincoln
 Joe Toussaint, Cardinal Hayes

Class A 

Participating teams, results and individual honors in Class A were as follows:

Participating teams

Results 

Albany Academy finished the season with a 17-5 record.

Individual honors 

The following players were awarded individual honors for their performances at the Federation Tournament:

Most Valuable Player 

 Hameir Wright, Albany Academy

All-Tournament Team 

 Brandon Abrams, Monsignor Farrell
 Gerald Drumgoole, Irondequoit
 Louis Florimon, Walton Campus
 August Mahoney, Albany Academy 
 Derek Smith, Walton Campus

Sportsmanship Award 

 C.J. Mulvey, Albany Academy

Class B 

Participating teams, results and individual honors in Class B were as follows:

Participating teams

Results 

La Salle Academy finished the season with a 27-2 record.

Individual honors 

The following players were awarded individual honors for their performances at the Federation Tournament:

Most Valuable Player 

 James Bouknight, La Salle Academy

All-Tournament Team 

 Isaiah Allen-Smith, La Salle Academy
 Zechariah Brown, Westhill
 Sean Dadey, Westhill
 Tyree Morris, Fannie Lou Hamer Freedom
 Dajuan Piper, Dwight

External links 

 http://www.nysbasketballbrackets.com/

References

High school basketball competitions in the United States
High school sports in New York (state)
Sports in Glens Falls, New York
Basketball competitions in New York (state)
High
New York